Tropidophorus is a genus of semiaquatic lizards in the skink family (Scincidae), found in Indochina, Borneo, Sulawesi, and the Philippines. They are sometimes known as water skinks or waterside skinks.

Species
The following 29 species are recognized:

Tropidophorus assamensis Annandale, 1912 – north-eastern water skink
Tropidophorus baconi Hikida, Riyanto & Ota, 2003
Tropidophorus baviensis Bourret, 1939 – Bavi water skink, Bavay's keeled skink
Tropidophorus beccarii W. Peters, 1871 – Beccari's keeled skink
Tropidophorus berdmorei (Blyth, 1853) – Berdmore's water skink
Tropidophorus boehmei T.Q. Nguyen et al., 2010 – Boehme's water skink
Tropidophorus brookei (Gray, 1845) – Brook's keeled skink
Tropidophorus cocincinensis A.M.C. Duméril & Bibron, 1839 – Cochinchinese water skink
Tropidophorus davaoensis Bacon, 1980 – Davao waterside skink
Tropidophorus grayi Günther, 1861 – Gray's water skink, spiny waterside skink, Gray's keeled skink
Tropidophorus guangxiensis Y. Wen, 1992
Tropidophorus hainanus M.A. Smith, 1923 – Hainan water skink
Tropidophorus hangnam Chuaynkern et al., 2005
Tropidophorus iniquus Lidth de Jeude, 1905
Tropidophorus laotus M.A. Smith, 1923 – Laotian water skink, Laotian keeled skink
Tropidophorus latiscutatus Hikida et al., 2002
Tropidophorus matsuii Hikida et al., 2002
Tropidophorus microlepis Günther, 1861 – small-scaled water skink
Tropidophorus micropus Lidth de Jeude, 1905
Tropidophorus misaminius Stejneger, 1908 – Misamis waterside skink
Tropidophorus mocquardii Boulenger, 1894 
Tropidophorus murphyi Hikida et al., 2002 – Murphy's water skink
Tropidophorus noggei T. Ziegler et al., 2005 – Nogge's water skink
Tropidophorus partelloi Stejneger, 1910 – Partello's waterside skink
Tropidophorus perplexus Barbour, 1921
Tropidophorus robinsoni M.A. Smith, 1919 – Robinson's water skink, Robinson's keeled skink
Tropidophorus sebi Pui, Karin, Bauer, & Das, 2017 – Baleh water skink
Tropidophorus sinicus Boettger, 1886 – Chinese water skink
Tropidophorus thai M.A. Smith, 1919 Thai water skink, Thai stream skink

Nota bene: A binomial authority in parentheses indicates that the species was originally described in a genus other than Tropidophorus.

References

Further reading
Duméril AMC, Bibron G (1839). Erpétologie générale ou histoire naturelle complète des reptiles. Tome cinquième [Volume 5]. Paris: Roret. viii + 854 pp. (Tropidophorus, new genus, pp. 554–556). (in French).

External links

 
Lizard genera
Taxa named by André Marie Constant Duméril
Taxa named by Gabriel Bibron